Jocelyn Margaret Newman  (née Mullett; 8 July 1937 – 1 April 2018) was an Australian politician. She was a Senator for Tasmania for 15 years, and a minister in the Howard Government.

Political career
Jocelyn Margaret Mullett was born in Melbourne, the eldest of three surviving children of Lyndhurst Mullett, a solicitor, and his wife Margaret (née Maughan). She was educated at Mont Albert Central School and Presbyterian Ladies' College. She was a barrister and solicitor before entering Parliament. She married Kevin Newman in 1961. Their son, Campbell, was the Lord Mayor of Brisbane, and later Premier of Queensland.

Newman was appointed to the Senate on 13 March 1986. In her first Senate speech, she quoted Dame Enid Lyons's first speech in the House of Representatives [from 1943]: "I know so well that fear, want and idleness can kill the spirit of any people. But I know too that security can be bought at too great a cost—the cost of spiritual freedom."

She served as Minister for Social Security in the first Howard Ministry from March 1996 to October 1998, Minister assisting the Prime Minister for the Status of Women from March 1996 to October 1997 and Minister for Family and Community Services and Minister assisting the Prime Minister for the Status of Women from October 1998 to January 2001.

In the 2005 Queen's Birthday Honours Newman was made an Officer of the Order of Australia (AO) "For service to the community through contributions to the development of government policies in relation to social security reform, as an advocate for women's issues, particularly in the health and welfare areas, and as a supporter of local organisations in Tasmania."

Personal life
Newman was successfully treated for breast cancer during her time in office. She resigned from parliament on 1 February 2002. Her husband died in 1999. Newman died at Berry, New South Wales on 1 April 2018, aged 80, from Alzheimer's disease. She was survived by her son (Campbell), her daughter (Mrs Kate Roff), and four granddaughters.

References

 

1937 births
2018 deaths
Liberal Party of Australia members of the Parliament of Australia
Members of the Australian Senate
Members of the Australian Senate for Tasmania
Women members of the Australian Senate
Members of the Cabinet of Australia
Officers of the Order of Australia
Australian barristers
Australian solicitors
University of Melbourne alumni
People educated at the Presbyterian Ladies' College, Melbourne
Deaths from Alzheimer's disease
Deaths from dementia in Australia
Delegates to the Australian Constitutional Convention 1998
Spouses of Australian politicians
Women government ministers of Australia
20th-century Australian women politicians
21st-century Australian women politicians
Government ministers of Australia